West Boca Raton Community High School (WBRCHS) is a magnet high school in Boca Raton, Florida, United States. It was established in 2004 and is part of the School District of Palm Beach County. The school primarily serves students from the western unincorporated part of Boca Raton known as West Boca Raton.

History 
In  2003, the Palm Beach County School Board named a planned new high school, "West Boca Raton Community High School."  The school building was constructed by James Pirtle Construction Inc. of Davie at a cost of $46 million. Construction progress was  featured on the district's construction project Web site.

WBRCHS opened in 2004 with three initial magnet academies: information technology, culinary arts, and drafting and design. Refuting rumors the school would be vocational, Principal Fran Giblin described the curriculum as "a comprehensive school that has the same offerings as other high schools in the county", with "honors and advanced-placement courses as well as band, art, athletics and offerings typical of any other high school".

In 2007, the National Career Academy and the Association for Career and Technical Education ranked the WBRCHS Culinary Arts Academy as a Model Academy. The ranking is based on "mission, structure, faculty, leadership, curriculum, and community involvement".

By 2014, the Academy of Medical Sciences was added to the curriculum, and in 2015, the Academy of Performing Arts was added, offering "theater, musical theater and instrumental music, drama", with dance to be added later.

The Boca Raton Tribune wrote there is an "Aviation Academy planned for West Boca High School in 2023".

The School District of Palm Beach County said in 2022 that the graduation rate for WBRCHS was 98%.

Events

Speed zone 
In 2011 the county's traffic division established a speed zone on Glades Road in front of WBRCHS. In 2014, two pedestrians were struck by a vehicle in front of the school.

Band invited to London 
London's former Lord Mayor of Westminster Duncan Sandy in 2015 invited the WBRCHS band to perform in London's New Year's Day Parade.

Controversy 
Former principal Mark Stenner admitted plagiarising graduation speeches from YouTube in 2015. He apologized and was relieved of his office.

Walkout 

Following the shootings at Marjory Stoneman Douglas High in February 2018, WBRCHS students observed 17 minutes of silence to honor the fallen students there. Then 90% of the student body walked out, marching 12 miles to the Parkland school. According to The Palm Beach Post, they marched from "...9:30 a.m. until reaching the northeast corner of Douglas High at 2 p.m. They were met by a crowd of Douglas High students and neighbors who cheered in support... Some at Olympic Heights in Boca Raton and Palm Beach Central in Wellington walked out Tuesday, although the crowds were far smaller than West Boca's." 

The walkout drew local and national attention.

References

External links 
 

Buildings and structures in Boca Raton, Florida
High schools in Palm Beach County, Florida
Public high schools in Florida
Magnet schools in Florida
Educational institutions established in 2004
2004 establishments in Florida